Michał Nalepa (born 22 January 1993) is a Polish professional footballer who plays as a centre-back for Lechia Gdańsk.

Club career
In July 2011, Nalepa joined Ruch Radzionków on a one-season loan deal from Wisła Kraków. He made his league debut for Radzionkow on 13 August 2011 in a 2–2 home draw with GKS Katowice. He was subbed on for Paweł Giel in the 58th minute. He scored his first league goal for the club on 3 September 2011 in a 3–1 away win against Arka Gdynia. His goal, the third of the match, came in the 47th minute. In the 2012–13 season he was loaned out to Bruk-Bet Termalica Nieciecza. He made his league debut for Termalica on 22 August 2012 in a 3–0 away victory over Polonia Bytom. He scored his first goal for the club on 3 November 2012 in a 1–1 away draw with Zawisza Bydgoszcz. His goal, scored in the 90th minute, rescued a point for the visitors that day. On 19 July 2013, Nalepa made his debut for Wisła Kraków in the Ekstraklasa match against Górnik Zabrze.

Ferencváros
On 7 June 2014, Nalepa signed three-year deal with Hungarian club Ferencvárosi TC. He made his league debut for the club on 27 July 2014 in a 3–1 away win against Kecskeméti TE. He was subbed on in the 83rd minute for Wergiton do Rosario Calmon. He scored his first league goal for the club on 26 July 2015 in a 3–1 home victory over Diósgyőri VTK. His goal, scored in the 5th minute, was the first of the match.

On 2 April 2016, Nalepa became Hungarian League champion with Ferencvárosi TC after losing to Debreceni VSC 2–1 at the Nagyerdei Stadion in the 2015–16 Nemzeti Bajnokság I season.

Lechia Gdańsk
On 1 July 2017, he became a Lechia Gdańsk player. He made his league debut for the club on 14 July 2017 in a 2–0 away win against Wisła Płock. He scored his first league goal for the club on 8 May 2018 in a 2–0 away win against Piast Gliwice. His goal, the first of the match, came in the 45th minute.

International career
Nalepa was the captain of Poland national under-17 football team during 2010 UEFA Under-17 Championship elite round as well as of Poland national under-19 football team during 2012 UEFA Under-19 Championship qualifying round.

Career statistics

Club

1Including Ligakupa.
1Including Szuperkupa.

Honours

Club
Ferencváros
Nemzeti Bajnokság I: 2015-16
Hungarian Cup: 2014–15, 2015–16, 2016-17
Hungarian League Cup: 2014–15
Hungarian Super Cup: 2015

Lechia Gdańsk
Polish Cup: 2018–19
Polish Super Cup: 2019

References

External links
 
 
 

1993 births
Living people
People from Chrzanów
Sportspeople from Lesser Poland Voivodeship
Polish footballers
Association football central defenders
Association football defenders
Ruch Radzionków players
Bruk-Bet Termalica Nieciecza players
Wisła Kraków players
Ferencvárosi TC footballers
Lechia Gdańsk players
I liga players
Ekstraklasa players
Nemzeti Bajnokság I players
Polish expatriate footballers
Expatriate footballers in Hungary
Polish expatriate sportspeople in Hungary
Poland youth international footballers